Patrick Corrigan may refer to:
Patrick Corrigan (writer), American author and advocate for people with mental illness
Patrick Corrigan (businessman) (born 1932), Australian businessman, art collector and philanthropist